"DJ Culture" is a song by English synth-pop duo Pet Shop Boys from their first greatest hits album, Discography: The Complete Singles Collection (1991). It was released on 14 October 1991 as the album's lead single, peaking at number 13 on the UK Singles Chart. Another version of the song, remixed by the Grid and entitled "Dj culturemix", was also released as a single and reached number 40 on the UK Singles Chart. The B-side was "Music for Boys".

According to the singer Neil Tennant, the song concerned the insincerity of how President George H. W. Bush's speeches at the time of the First Gulf War utilised Winston Churchill's wartime rhetoric, in a manner similar to how artists sample music from other artists. The music video alternately features Neil Tennant and Chris Lowe as a pair of doctors, a pair of soldiers in desert combat dress, a judge presiding over Oscar Wilde (the line "And I my lord, may I say nothing?" is a close paraphrase of Wilde's comment after being sentenced to hard labour for homosexual practices) and a football referee and fan.

The French sample in the song is taken from the 1950 Jean Cocteau film Orphée: in it coded and poetic messages are sent over the radio.

Critical reception
Upon its release, Paul Mathur, writing for Melody Maker, felt "DJ Culture" "recall[s] PSB's earliest work" as "Tennant intones rigorously over the usual unabashed keyboard surge, like an indoor version of 'West End Girls'." Simon Dudfield of NME felt it was "sub-standard Pet Shop Boys" with "no surprises". He stated, "Please could they deliver another chorus? There needs to be some proof of pop elegance if Tennant's irony and aloofness is going to sound anything other than smarmy, sickly and sad. A plastic veneer smothers the disco beat, the strings from their last single remain and the 'Suburbia'-style shock of keyboards that sets up the tawdry chorus suggests ideas are running dry."

Track listings

UK 7": Parlophone / R 6301 
 "DJ Culture"
 "Music for Boys"

 also the track listing for the US 7" releases on EMI.

UK 12": Parlophone / 12R 6301 
 "DJ Culture" (Extended mix)
 "Music for Boys"
 "Music for Boys (Part 2/Ambient mix)"

UK CDs: Parlophone / CDR 6301
 "DJ Culture"
 "Music for Boys"
 "DJ Culture" (Extended mix)

UK 12" / 12RX 6301 and CDs: Parlophone ("Dj Culturemix")
 "Dj Culturemix" – 5:51
 "Music for Boys (Part 3)" – 5:37
 "Overture to Performance" – 6:15

Track 2 is a remix by Altern-8.

Track 3 is an orchestra medley featuring "It's a Sin",  "Being Boring", "Opportunities", "So Hard ", "Jealousy", "Suburbia", "How Can You Expect to Be Taken Seriously?", "What Have I Done To Deserve This?", and "West End Girls".

Charts

References

1991 singles
1991 songs
Parlophone singles
Pet Shop Boys songs
Songs written by Chris Lowe
Songs written by Neil Tennant